D’Andrea or d’Andrea is an Italian surname, literally meaning "Andrew's", "of Andrew" (it is cognate with the surname Anderson). It may refer to:

Bettina d'Andrea (b. unknown, d. 1335), Italian lawyer and professor
Francesco D'Andrea (1625–1698), Italian jurist and natural philosopher
Franco D'Andrea (b. 1941), Italian jazz and rock pianist
Gerolamo Marquese d' Andrea (1812–1868), Italian cardinal
Giovanni d'Andrea (1275–1384), Italian expert in canon law
John D'Andrea (contemporary), American television music composer and arranger
Marcelo D'Andrea (contemporary), Argentine film actor
Novella d'Andrea (b. unknown, d. 1333), Italian lawyer and professor
Oscar d'Andrea (contemporary), Italian champion bobsledder
Oswald d'Andréa (b. 1934), French composer

Italian-language surnames
Patronymic surnames
Surnames from given names